Amalia Glacier, also known as Skua Glacier, is a tidewater glacier located in Bernardo O'Higgins National Park on the edge of the Sarmiento Channel. The glacier originates in the Southern Patagonian Ice Field. From 1945 to 1986, its terminus retreated , being, along with the recession of the O'Higgins Glacier, the most dramatic retreat of the glaciers of the mentioned icefield during that period. 

The glacier partially surrounds Reclus volcano and erodes the northern flank of it.

See also 
 Retreat of glaciers since 1850

References

External links 
 

Glaciers of Magallanes Region